The Goa Gap is one of the major passes in India's Western Ghats mountain range, between the Maharashtra and Karnataka sections of the range.

Mountain passes of the Western Ghats
Mountain passes of Maharashtra
Mountain passes of Karnataka